Tropical Storm Matthew was a weak tropical storm in the 2004 Atlantic hurricane season that made landfall on Louisiana. It was the thirteenth tropical storm of the season and the ninth to affect the United States. It formed over the western Gulf of Mexico on October 8 and struck south-central Louisiana two days later. Damage was minimal, totaling $305,000 (2004 USD), and no casualties were reported.

Meteorological history

A tropical wave moved off the coast of Africa on September 19. The wave moved westward, but was difficult to track due to its proximity to Hurricane Lisa and another large tropical wave. It passed through the Lesser Antilles, and slowly organized as convection increased due to an upper-level low. On October 5, it entered the Gulf of Mexico, and developed an area of low pressure two days later.

The depression moved to the east-northeast, and quickly strengthened into Tropical Storm Matthew. Operationally, Matthew fluctuated between tropical depression and tropical storm status, but in post-season analysis, the storm remained a tropical storm. Strong wind shear limited further strengthening, and on October 10, Matthew struck Cocodrie, Louisiana as a minimal tropical storm. It became an extratropical cyclone, occluding near the time of landfall.

After it merged with the system, the storm moved inland over Arkansas, Tennessee and the Ohio Valley. While moving inland, Matthew spun off another low pressure system that formed over North Carolina on October 13. The low moved off the Mid-Atlantic coast before hitting Massachusetts two days later, and later merged with the original low pressure system of Matthew.

Preparations
Initially, forecasters at the National Hurricane Center predicted that Matthew would take a more eastern track and hit the Florida Panhandle. Because the track shifted westward, the National Hurricane Center issued a Tropical Storm Warning from the Florida/Alabama border to Intracoastal City, Louisiana on the day before landfall.

Impact

Louisiana

The storm surge and waves resulted in significant beach erosion in Grand Isle. In addition, Matthew spawned one tornado, causing damage to the roof of a trailer in Golden Meadow.

Rainfall and storm surge flooded 20 homes in Terrebonne Parish. In addition, several homes in Lafouche Parish experienced flooding, including two with over two feet of water. Numerous homes in Golden Meadow experienced flooding, as well. The flooding also forced the temporary closing of numerous roads across the state, including portions of U.S. Route 11 and Interstate 10. Flood waters from the storm cracked a water line in LaPlace, leaving nearly 30,000 residents and many businesses without tap water. The problem was expected to take little time to fix, though residents were advised to boil the water before drinking it. Matthew also left 2,500 people without power for a short period of time. The storm's impact also closed several schools, forcing school administrators to reschedule plans for making up school closings caused by Hurricane Ivan one month earlier. In all, Matthew caused no deaths and $255,000 in damage (2004 USD).

Elsewhere
As the storm made landfall, the outer-bands of Matthew brought heavy rains in Florida. The rain was reported as far south as Naples. The beach erosion, which typically would have been minor for a weak storm, was greater than expected due to the passage of Hurricane Ivan just weeks before. No major damage was reported in Alabama. Damage in Mississippi totaled to $50,000 (2004 USD).

Matthew produced moderate rainfall on its west side, as well. The rainfall was well-received due to a period of dry weather in the area. Though it slowed harvest activities, it aided pastures. Rainfall patches left in Matthew's reached as far north as Northeastern Ohio.

See also

 Other storms of the same name
 Tropical cyclone
Timeline of the 2004 Atlantic hurricane season
 List of Florida hurricanes (2000–present)

References

External links

 Matthew's Tropical Cyclone Report
 Matthew Flooding
 Matthew rainfall totals

Matthew
Matthew (2004)
Matthew (2004)
Matthew (2004)
Matthew (2004)
Matthew (2004)
Matthew (2004)
Matthew (2004)
Matthew (2004)
2004 natural disasters in the United States
Matthew